Bluff is a port city on the Caribbean coast of Nicaragua within the bay of Bluefields. Bluff handles limited cargo and has basic piers. It is also a base for the sea-going fishing vessels on Nicaragua's Caribbean coast.

The island that it sits on is now connected to the mainland via a causeway constructed between 2004 and 2007.

See also

 List of lighthouses in Nicaragua
 Transport in Nicaragua

References

Populated places in Nicaragua
South Caribbean Coast Autonomous Region
Lighthouses in Nicaragua